ISO 3166-2:NE is the entry for Niger in ISO 3166-2, part of the ISO 3166 standard published by the International Organization for Standardization (ISO), which defines codes for the names of the principal subdivisions (e.g., provinces or states) of all countries coded in ISO 3166-1.

Currently for Niger, ISO 3166-2 codes are defined for 1 urban community and 7 regions. The urban community Niamey is the capital of the country and has special status equal to the regions. 

Each code consists of two parts, separated by a hyphen. The second part is a digit:
 1–7: regions
 8: urban community

Current codes
Subdivision names are listed as in the ISO 3166-2 standard published by the ISO 3166 Maintenance Agency (ISO 3166/MA).

Click on the button in the header to sort each column.

See also
 Subdivisions of Niger
 FIPS region codes of Niger

External links
 ISO Online Browsing Platform: NE
 Regions of Niger, Statoids.com

2:NE
ISO 3166-2
Niger geography-related lists